Marilyn J. Rasmussen (born March 10, 1939) is an American farmer and politician who served as a member of the Washington State Senate, representing the 2nd district from 1993 to 2009. A member of the Democratic Party, she previously served as a member of the Washington House of Representatives from 1987 to 1993.

References

1939 births
Living people
Democratic Party members of the Washington House of Representatives
Democratic Party Washington (state) state senators
Women state legislators in Washington (state)